Codford railway station was an intermediate station on the Salisbury branch line of the Great Western Railway built along the Wylye valley to connect  and  to serve the surrounding villages, and situated along the lane from Codford St Peter to Boyton.

History
The station opened on 30 June 1856, at the same time as this section of the line. The original single platform was built on the north side of the line next to a level crossing.  A passing loop was installed here in 1897 which necessitated the construction of a second platform to serve trains towards Westbury. The line was doubled from Heytesbury in 1899 and on to Wylye in 1900.

When an army camp was built at Codford in 1914, a  branch line was built connecting it to the station. The branch was taken over at the end of the First World War by the Great Western Railway but closed in 1922.

The station lost its passenger service on 19 September 1955 and its goods yard was closed on 10 June 1963. The signal box remained in use until June 1982, when the level crossing was automated.

Services
Trains still run between Warminster and Salisbury, but no longer stop anywhere in between.

References 

Railway stations in Great Britain opened in 1856
Rail transport in Wiltshire
Railway stations in Great Britain closed in 1955
Disused railway stations in Wiltshire
Former Great Western Railway stations